is a Japanese actor, singer song writer, and guitarist. He is famous for playing the role of Ryu on the television jidaigeki Hissatsu series.

He has appeared in films and television series including Legend of the Eight Samurai, Sukeban Deka, Kamen Rider Black, Ultraman: Towards the Future (aka Ultraman Great), Cutie Honey, Chage and Aska, Ōedo Sōsamō, Mito Kōmon, Anmitsu Hime, Food Fight, Ultraman Tiga, Ultraman Dyna, Ii Hito, GARO,  Tenchu:Yamino Shiokinin and most recently 81diver. He has performed on the soundtracks to GARO and Garo Special: Byakuya no Maju, performing the first two ending themes for the former, and producing GARO Project's performances of the final two ending themes for the series and the ending theme for the special.

Masaki got a role in a buster film Legend of the Eight Samurai as Inuzuka Shino and it became a sensation that lead to Masaki's break out role "Ryu"  on a popular Japanese period piece samurai drama series Hissatsu Shigotonin where he played Japanese obi-belt maker who is ex-ninja turned to be an assassin (shigotonin) to kill bad guys. He became a big star by that role and since then has appeared in numerous period piece drama series. He often plays a role much younger than his actual age due to youthful appearance. His picture with his son Taiga Kyomoto (SixTONES)  went viral in Asia and many thought he is Taiga's older brother instead of father.  He is an established musician as well produced sound track for TV shows and music for himself and other singers.

Discography
Albums
 - February 21, 1984
Temptation - October 21, 1984
 - June 21, 1985
Party - November 21, 1985
 - August 21, 1986
My present - November 21, 1986
 - June 21, 1987
 - November 1, 1987
 - November 1, 1987
 - May 1, 1988
 - December 21, 1988
LOVE IS ALL - December 23, 1998
 - May 26, 2004
 - November 23, 2005
 - March 20, 2013
Masaki Kyomoto Music works 1982-2014 30th anniversary special Edition June 7, 2014

Singles
 - March 5, 1984
 - December 24, 1984
 - November 1, 1987
 - November 1, 1987
"BLUE EYE'S MEMORY" - September 25, 1988
 - April 25, 1997
 - January 21, 2001
 - November 26, 2004
"I LOVE YOU" - July 21, 2005
 - February 8, 2006
 - February 8, 2006
Doubt -April 1, 2015

Soundtracks
 - December 1, 1990
For Ultraman Great
 - December 21, 1990
For Ultraman Great
 - November 1, 1991
 - May 22, 1996
 - May 22, 1996
 - April 26, 2006
 - April 26, 2006

Production work
 by Kouichi Uenoyama - October 21, 1984
 by Izumi Ayukawa - November 21, 1985
"BLUE EYE'S MEMORY" by Kazunasa Ogata - August 21, 1988
"GARO ~Boku ga Ai o Tsutaeteyuku~" by Garo Project - July 17, 2006
 by Garo Project - November 22, 2006
"Onna wa Umi" by Tsuyoshi Seto - February 6, 2008

Filmography

Films
Legend of the Eight Samurai (1983), Inuzuka Shino Moritaka
Hissatsu! III Ura ka Omote ka (1986)
Shogun's Shadow (1989), Tokugawa Iemitsu
Fly Me to the Saitama (2019), Duke Saitama

Television
Kusa Moeru (1979), Komawaka-maru (later known as Miura Mitsumura)
Hissatsu Shigotonin V (1985)
Hissatsu Shigotonin V Gekitouhen (1985–86)
Ōedo Sōsamō (1990–91), 
Kōkō Kyōshi (1993), Tomoki Fujimura
Homeless Child (1994), Kazuhiko Kurosaki
Mōri Motonari (1997), Kikkawa Okitsune
The Sun Never Sets (2000), Etsushi Minami
Kōkō Kyōshi (2003), Tomoki Fujimura
Taira no Kiyomori (2012), Fujiwara no Hidehira

References

External links

La Cetzna.com - Official website 
Ryus-up 
Talent Profile at Zan 
Samurai Guitar Spirits 

1959 births
Japanese composers
Japanese male composers
Japanese male musicians
Living people
People from Suita
Japanese male actors